The International Trumpet Guild (ITG) is an international organization of trumpet players. Members include professional and amateur performers, teachers, students, manufacturers, publishers, and others interested in the trumpet. ITG is a nonprofit, tax-exempt organization supported by the dues of individual members.

Formation
ITG was established in 1975. In 1975, the first ITG Conference was held in Bloomington, Indiana; the following year the Guild met as part of the First International Brass Congress in Montreux, Switzerland. ITG Conferences have been held every year since then, with the Second International Brass Congress being held in 1984 at Indiana University.

In 1982, the ITG Archive was established at Western Michigan University to chronicle the Guild's activities and to preserve historical trumpet-related research. The ITG Research Library serves as a lending library for trumpet-related research.

In 1988, plans were begun to form a larger European component of ITG. In fall, 1990 the Euro-ITG chapter was formed at the Trumpet Days in Bad Sackingen, Germany, with initial membership of 120 members. An International Membership Coordinator was appointed to further develop growth of ITG. The Euro-ITG chapter disbanded in 2003.

Honorary Award
The ITG Honorary Award is given to those individuals who have made extraordinary contributions to the art of trumpet playing. These contributions are through performance, teaching, publishing, research, and/or composition. The tradition has been to award persons only toward the end of their careers, rather than at the beginning or height of their careers.

The ITG Honorary Award does not have to be given every year, and it is possible to award more than one per year.

ITG Honorary Award Winners
 1987 – Roger Voisin
 1992 – Maurice André
 1993 – Louis Armstrong and Armando Ghitalla
 1995 – Clifford Lillya and Robert Nagel
 1997 – Philip Jones
 1998 – Adolph Herseth
 1999 – Vincent Cichowicz
 2000 – Edward Tarr
 2002 – Dizzy Gillespie
 2003 – Clark Terry
 2004 – Mel Broiles, Clifford Brown, Miles Davis and Harry Glantz
 2006 - Philip Smith
 2007 - Maynard Ferguson and Charles Schlueter
 2008 - Maurice Murphy
 2009 - Herb Alpert
 2010 - Uan Rasey
 2011 - Roger Delmotte and Susan Slaughter
 2012 - Fred Mills and Ronald Romm
 2014 - Gilbert Johnson
 2015 - Bobby Shew
 2019 - Ryan Anthony

Award of Merit

The ITG Award of Merit is given to those individuals who have made substantial contributions to the art of trumpet playing through performance, teaching, publishing, research, composition, and/or support of the goals of the International Trumpet Guild.

There is no requirements that the award be given annually, and no restrictions are made as to the number of recipients.

ITG Award of Merit Winners
 2000 – Gordon Mathie
 2002 – Charles Colin and Stephen L. Glover
 2003 – Leonard Candelaria, Ray Crisara and John Haynie
 2004 – William Adam, D. Kim Dunnick, Frank Kaderabek, and Anatoly Selianin
 2005 – Anne Hardin, David Hickman, Benjamin Margolin, James Olcott
 2006 - Joyce Davis, Vincent DiMartino, Charles Gorham, Stephen Jones, Leon Rapier
 2007 - Richard Burkart, Bengt Eklund, Carole Dawn Reinhart
 2008 - Stephen Chennette
 2009 - David Bullock, Gilbert H. Mitchell, Jeffrey Piper
 2010 - Bryan Goff and Gordon Webb
 2011 - William Pfund
 2012 - Keith Johnson and Dennis Schneider
 2013 - Rob Roy McGregor
 2014 - David Baldwin, Kevin Eisensmith, Gary Mortenson

Other awards

Prior to 1987, ITG had recognized several trumpet players with awards; these include:

 1977 - Timofei Dokschitzer
 1979 – Renold Schilke (Plaque and honorary lifetime membership)
 1979 – Rafael Méndez (Recognition Plaque)
 1982 – Doc Severinsen (Recognition Plaque)
 1983 – Robert King (Recognition Plaque)
 1984 – William Vacchiano (Recognition Plaque)

Publications
Membership in ITG includes a subscription to all regular publications:
 ITG Journal (4 issues per year, see below)
 Special Supplements to Journals (CDs, music, books)
 Complete Index of Journals (biennial)

ITG has sponsored other publications and reprints:
 The Memoirs of Timofei Dokshizer
 The History of the Trumpet of Bach and Handel by Werner Menke
 Lowrey's International Trumpet Discography by Alvin Lowrey

Journal
The ITG Journal is published quarterly and includes articles on history, performance, literature, recordings, research, pedagogy, physiology, interviews, instrument modifications, and many other trumpet-related areas. The Journal features columns dealing with aspects of trumpet performance and reviews of books, music, and CDs.

Competitions
ITG hosts annual competitions for students under 25 including scholarship competitions, solo trumpet, orchestral except and jazz solo competitions.

In addition ITG sponsors two major trumpet competitions - The Ellsworth Smith International Trumpet Solo Competition which takes place every 4 years, and the Carmine Caruso International Jazz Trumpet Solo Competition, which takes place every 2 years.

References

External links

Organizations established in 1975
Brass instrument organizations